Antuco may refer to:
 Antuco (volcano), in Chile
 Antuco, Chile
 Antuco Hydroelectric Plant
 Tragedy of Antuco